WMJI (105.7 FM) is a commercial radio station licensed to Cleveland, Ohio, featuring a classic hits format dubbed "Majic 105.7". Owned by iHeartMedia, the station serves Greater Cleveland and much of surrounding Northeast Ohio. WMJI's studios are located in downtown Cleveland's Gateway District at the Six Six Eight Building, while the transmitter resides in the Cleveland suburb of Parma. In addition to a standard analog transmission, WMJI broadcasts over two HD Radio channels and is available online via iHeartRadio.

History

Early years
On December 6, 1948, the station signed on as WTAM-FM, under the ownership of NBC and largely simulcast WTAM (1100 AM). Both radio stations were also paired with WNBK-TV (later WKYC-TV), which signed on that same year. NBC traded its radio and television holdings in Cleveland with Westinghouse Broadcasting's stations in Philadelphia on February 13, 1956. Westinghouse installed its own call signs on the stations, with WTAM-FM becoming KYW-FM. The AM station became KYW and the TV station became KYW-TV.

When the NBC-Westinghouse trade was reversed on June 19, 1965, the station reverted to NBC ownership. The call letters were changed to WKYC-FM to match those of the AM station, which kept the popular "KY" slogan and identity Westinghouse brought into Cleveland. WKYC-FM played similar middle of the road (MOR) music to WKYC, but for part of the day, it used its own disc jockeys and had less chatter than the AM station.

M-105
NBC eventually sold off WKYC and WKYC-FM in 1972 to Ohio Communications, owned by Nick Mileti and Jim and Tom Embrescia. The station became WWWM, and initially broadcast a syndicated beautiful music format.

In 1975, the format was changed to album-oriented rock and the station identified itself as "M-105". The station used the slogan "The Home of Continuous Music", and was led by former WIXY program director Eric Stevens. M-105 competed aggressively with rock station rival WMMS for ratings by programming a more limited playlist. Never able to eclipse WMMS in the ratings, by 1980 M-105 began billing itself as "Cleveland's Classic Rock", playing a mix of rock music from the mid-1960s to the late 1970s, with a few current rock titles from veteran artists on its playlist.

Majic Radio

WWWM and WBBG were sold to Robinson Communications, headed by famed jeweler Larry "J.B." Robinson, in 1981. The station changed to an adult contemporary format as WMJI on June 14, 1982, branded as "Majic Radio". The station was sold to Jacor Communications of Cincinnati along with AM station WBBG on September 19, 1984.

John Lanigan began his long-running morning show with former WHK newscaster John Webster on September 17, 1985, returning to Cleveland after a brief stint at WMGG in Tampa, Florida. He replaced husband-and-wife team Dan Deely and Kim Scott after they resigned, citing that the job had put strains on their marriage.

When co-owned WBBG (1260 AM) dumped its adult standards format on October 29, 1987, it simulcast WMJI's programming for a time - and took the WMJI call letters - until it was sold off. Therefore, 105.7 FM technically was WMJI-FM for several months in 1988. When WBBG became WRDZ with a Christian radio format, the FM station returned to the WMJI call letters without the FM suffix. In 1988, Jacor Communications entered a local marketing agreement (LMA) with Legacy Broadcasting, headed by former Malrite executive Carl Hirsch. Legacy took over the running of WMJI and bought the station outright in 1990.

Majic 105.7
By September 1990, the station adjusted the format to oldies, featuring much of the music made famous by Top 40 legends WHK and WIXY. WHK, which dropped the rock and roll format in the mid-1960s, had re-established itself as an oldies station in the 1980s, but had dropped that format by November 1988. Ironically, WIXY was the previous identity of former sister station WBBG, and held the same studio space that WIXY once did. In addition, much of WMJI's music library already consisted of former WIXY tapes and jingles.

John Gorman, former program director of legendary Cleveland rock station WMMS, was brought in to redesign WMJI as a 100% rock oldies format, with no pop or dance hits. Under his guidance, the station immediately posted major ratings increases and became one of the top performing stations in Cleveland. Gorman also reunited with former WMMS artist and co-creator of the station's "Buzzard" mascot David Helton to create a new logo, featured on early print ads and billboards for WMJI. The "Majic 105.7" font was chosen by Gorman as a tribute to the 1967-era logo for Boston's WRKO (680 AM), which, under the direction of Program Director Mel Phillips, was an influence on Gorman's programming.

WMJI owner Legacy Broadcasting was later renamed OmniAmerica in 1994, and sold the station to Nationwide Communications in 1997. By then, WMJI had established consistent ratings dominance in the Cleveland market under Program Director Denny Sanders, a market veteran who replaced John Gorman. (Gorman relocated to CBS Radio in Detroit). WMJI was led by its highly rated morning show featuring Lanigan, Webster, and local comedian Jimmy Malone. Webster left the station amid a health scare in 1997, while the "Lanigan & Malone Show" remained intact until Lanigan's retirement on March 31, 2014. During the period when Lanigan and Malone hosted mornings, WMJI achieved the highest total weekly listenership of any Cleveland radio station in the decade of the 1990s, winning the National Association of Broadcasters "Large Market Station of the Year" honor in 1998. It later became the FM flagship station for Cleveland Browns football broadcasts from 1999 to 2001.

The "Majic" brand
The popularity of WMJI in the late 1990s allowed Clear Channel to "franchise" WMJI's format and "Majic" nickname on several FM oldies stations and one AM station, mostly in the Midwest. These stations included, at its height: WYNT in Marion, WIMJ in Findlay, WMJK in Sandusky, WZOM in Defiance (then also branded as "Majic 105.7"), WMKJ in Louisville and WKEQ in Somerset, Kentucky.

Of those stations, only WYNT still uses the "Majic" name and shares a similar logo to WMJI, although the station switched to adult contemporary music. Early in November 2006, WTHZ-FM in Lexington, North Carolina, a station owned by "Davidson County Broadcasting", changed formats to "Majic 94.1" - replete with a similar logo to WMJI's. This continued until March 2010, when the station changed formats.

On July 30, 2022, the station was branded as "Elton 105.7" from noon to midnight only playing Elton John songs during his Farewell Yellow Brick Road tour when he performed in Cleveland that night.

Changes in ownership
In August 1998, Nationwide Communications merged operations with Jacor, reuniting WMJI with its former owner (and also was paired up with WTAM again, bringing the two stations' original relationship full circle). This was followed in May 1999 by the $6.5 billion purchase of Jacor and its 454 stations by iHeartMedia (then known as Clear Channel Communications), including WMJI. Denny Sanders departed WMJI in 2001 to join the management team at The Telos Alliance, a Cleveland-based international broadcast equipment design company.

Under the oldies format, WMJI has been recognized at the NAB Marconi Radio Awards. The station has been named Large Market Station of the Year twice (1998, 2003), and three times as Oldies Station of the Year (2002, 2004, 2006). Longtime morning team John Lanigan and Jimmy Malone were also named Large Market Personality of the Year in 2005.

Current programming
WMJI's lineup features longtime WMJI personality Mark Nolan, Jen Picciano, and Krystle Elyse in mornings, Martha Quinn's nationally syndicated show in middays (from iHeart), and local host Keith Kennedy on overnights. WMJI airs Premium Choice content fed from outside of Cleveland during weekday afternoons, evenings, and weekend shifts. WMJI also plays Christmas music throughout the holiday season. The HD2 digital subchannel was re-activated in August 2021 and will air the K-Love programming service. The HD2 subchannel previously aired iHeart 50s until August 2019.

References

External links

Cleveland Broadcast Radio Archives: WMJI timeline 

1948 establishments in Ohio
Classic hits radio stations in the United States
IHeartMedia radio stations
Nationwide Communications
Radio stations established in 1948
MJI